Cahen is a surname and/or a first name that may refer to:

 Cahen's constant, an infinite series of unit fractions, with alternating signs, derived from Sylvester's sequence
 Cahen–Mellin integral, an integral transform

People 
 Albert Cahen (1846–1903), French composer
 Claude Cahen (1909–1991), French orientalist and Islamic historian
 Coralie Cahen (1832-1899), philanthropist
 Ernest Cahen (1828–1893), French composer and organist
 Louis Cahen d'Anvers (1837–1922), French banker
 Mónica Cahen D'Anvers (born 1934), Argentine journalist, TV news host, and actress
 Fritz Max Cahén (1891–1966), German journalist, writer, and spy

See also 
 Cohen (surname), Kohen, Cohan, Cahan

Kohenitic surnames